The Ahmad Jamal Trio: Volume IV is a 1958 jazz album by pianist Ahmad Jamal. The album was recorded live on location at the Spotlight Club in Washington, DC, on September 6, 1958. The LP was released as Argo Records LP-636. This was Jamal's first recording following his surprise hit record, At the Pershing: But Not for Me.

Critical reception 
Scott Yanow of AllMusic notes that Volume IV "gives one a fairly definitive sampling of the unusual sound of the group, which could play with great passion while lowering the volume." Yanow commends the versions of "Taboo," "The Girl Next Door," "Cheek to Cheek," and "Secret Love" recorded on the album.

Track listing 

 "Taboo" (M. Lecuona) (3:55)
 "Should I" (Herb Brown, Arthur Freed) (3:31)
 "Stompin' at the Savoy" (Sampson, Webb, Goodman, Razaf, Robbins) (4:15)
 "The Girl Next Door" (Martin & Blaine, Leo Feist) (3:22)
 "I Wish I Knew" (Gordon, Warren) (3:27)
 "Cheek to Cheek" (Irving Berlin) (4:46)
 "Autumn in New York" (Vernon Duke) (3:11)
 "Secret Love" (S. Fein, P. Webster) (3:40)
 "Squatty Roo" (Johnny Hodges) (2:14)
 "That's All" (Brandt, Haymes) (2:29)

Personnel 
 Ahmad Jamal – piano
 Israel Crosby – double bass
 Vernel Fournier – drums

Production 
 Malcomn Chisholm – recording engineer
 Don Bronstein – photo and cover design
 Dave Usher – producer

Release history 
 Ahmad Jamal (LP, Album)	London Records,	UK 1959	
 Volume IV (LP, Album)	Argo Records, US 1958	
 Ahmad Jamal (LP, Album, Mono), Quality, Canada	 	
 Ahmad Jamal (LP, Album)	Chess, Australia	 	
 "Ahmad Jamal" Volume 4 (LP), Philips, Australia 1959

References 

Ahmad Jamal live albums
1958 live albums
Argo Records live albums